Pierre-Yves Monette (born 1960) is the former Secretary-General of EurEau, a visiting professor at the College of Europe, registered Mediator and attorney at the Brussels Bar. He was formerly a councilor to King Baudouin and King Albert II of Belgium and Federal Ombudsman of Belgium. He has been candidate to the functions of European Ombudsman and of Human Right Commissioner of the Council of Europe.

Author of several essays, books and articles on European integration, law, mediation, good governance and the future of Belgium, he regularly participates to public debates and is commonly cited by the press on matters relating to Belgian royalty.

Publications 
 Entretiens avec Christian Laporte: Belgique où vas-tu ?, (French) Mardaga, 2007
 Métier de roi, (French) Alice, 2002 (trans. Beroep: koning der Belgen, (Dutch) Van Hallewyck, 2003)
 L'Europe, état d'urgence, (French) Desclée de Brouwer, 1997
 Les États-Unis d'Europe, (French) Nauwelaerts, 1993

References

Politicians from Brussels
Academic staff of the College of Europe
Living people
1960 births
Jurists from Brussels
Dignitaries of the Belgian court